The 2021–22 Princeton Tigers men's basketball team represented Princeton University in the 2021–22 NCAA Division I men's basketball season. The Tigers, led by 10th-year head coach Mitch Henderson, played their home games at Jadwin Gymnasium in Princeton, New Jersey as members of the Ivy League.

Previous season
Due to the COVID-19 pandemic, the Ivy League chose not to conduct a season in 2020–21.

Roster

Schedule and results

|-
!colspan=12 style=| Non-conference regular season

|-
!colspan=12 style=| Ivy League regular season

|-
!colspan=12 style=| Ivy League Tournament

|-
!colspan=12 style=| NIT
|-

Source

References

Princeton Tigers men's basketball seasons
Princeton Tigers
Princeton Tigers men's basketball
Princeton Tigers men's basketball
Princeton